Aurivirus is a genus of viruses in the order Herpesvirales, and one of only two genera the family Malacoherpesviridae. Haliotid molluscs serve as natural hosts. There is only one species described in this genus, Haliotid herpesvirus 1 (AbHV-1), commonly known as abalone herpesvirus. A disease associated with this virus is acute ganglioneuritis.

Discovery
In 2005 there was an outbreak of acute ganglioneuritis in an Australian population of the edible gastropod mollusc, abalone (Haliotis laevigata and H. rubra). Potential herpesvirus particles had also been identified previously in Taiwan following mortalities in H. diversicolor. Using transmission electron microscopy, herpes-like particles were observed in ganglia of affected abalone and purified virions from moribund abalone nervous tissues were identified as resembling those of herpesviruses.

A diagnostic PCR test was developed to detect the virus in 2010. The test detected viral DNA sequences in diseased abalone from separate geographical locations in Australia and in DNA isolated from a herpes-like virus found previously in Taiwan. Savin et al. (2010) purified abalone virus particles and isolated and sequenced genomic DNA of Haliotid herpesvirus 1.

Structure
Haliotid herpesvirus 1 is enveloped, with spherical to pleomorphic geometry, and T=16 symmetry. The diameter is around 150 nm. The genome is linear and non-segmented, around 212kb in length.

Life cycle 
Viral replication is nuclear. DNA-templated transcription is the method of transcription. Haliotid molluscs serve as the natural hosts, including Haliotis diversicolor.

References

External links

 Viralzone: Aurivirus
 ICTV

Malacoherpesviridae
Virus genera